A Waltz Dream (German: Ein Walzertraum) is a 1925 German silent drama film directed by Ludwig Berger and starring Willy Fritsch, Mady Christians and Xenia Desni. It was based on the 1907 operetta Ein Walzertraum composed by Oscar Straus. It was influential on the development of later Viennese operetta films. Unlike many of UFA's ambitious productions of the 1920s, A Waltz Dream managed to recover its production cost in the domestic market alone.

The film's art direction was by Rudolf Bamberger.

Cast
 Willy Fritsch as Nicholas Count Preyn 
 Mady Christians as Princess Alix 
 Xenia Desni as Franzi Steingruber 
 Lydia Potechina as Steffi, Bassistin 
 Mathilde Sussin as Frl. von Koeckeritz 
 Karl Beckersachs as Archduke Peter Franz 
 Julius Falkenstein as Rockhoff von Hoffrock 
 Hans Brausewetter as Der Pikkolo 
 Jakob Tiedtke as Eberhard XXIII von Flausenthurm 
 Lucie Höflich

References

Bibliography
 Hardt, Ursula. From Caligari to California: Erich Pommer's life in the International Film Wars. Berghahn Books, 1996.
 Kreimeier, Klaus. The Ufa Story: A History of Germany's Greatest Film Company, 1918-1945. University of California Press, 1999.

External links

1925 films
1925 drama films
German drama films
Films of the Weimar Republic
German silent feature films
Films directed by Ludwig Berger
Films based on operettas
Films set in Vienna
Films set in the 1910s
Films scored by Oscar Straus
Films produced by Erich Pommer
UFA GmbH films
German black-and-white films
Silent drama films
1920s German films
1920s German-language films